Flavius Paterius was a politician of the Roman Empire; he was made consul for 443 as the junior partner of Petronius Maximus.

He was a praetorian prefect of Italy on September 27, 442.

Bibliography 
 

5th-century Romans
5th-century Roman consuls
Imperial Roman consuls
Praetorian prefects of Italy